The International House, Berkeley (also known as I-House) is a multi-cultural residence and program center serving students at the University of California, Berkeley. According to the International House, its mission is to foster intercultural respect, understanding, lifelong friendships and leadership skills for the promotion of a more tolerant and peaceful world.

About 
I-House is a dormitory for advanced undergraduates, graduate and professional students and visiting scholars. The House was created as a gift from John D. Rockefeller Jr. specifically to foster relationships between students from different countries. It is notable for having housed many famous artists, scientists, and scholars connected with the university, including Nobel laureates, royal family members, ambassadors and United Nations staff.

The House is the subject of a documentary called "The Visionaries: International House", which was aired by PBS stations across America.  The documentary, hosted by Sam Waterston, highlights how the International House on the Berkeley campus has served as one of the largest, most diverse, residential, global communities in the world.

The International House has several rooms and lounges that overlook the San Francisco Bay and Golden Gate Bridge. Nearly 600 international and American students from 70 nations live in the house during the academic year.

History
International House Berkeley was part of a larger "International House movement", founded by Harry E. Edmonds. Edmonds decided to investigate the situation of foreign students in New York City. With the funding and support of John D. Rockefeller Jr., the first International House opened in New York in 1924. Edmonds and Rockefeller decided to extend the idea. 

When the idea of International House was first proposed to the Berkeley community in the 1920s, there was considerable resistance -- resistance to coeducational housing; foreigners living in the area; and a racially-integrated setting. Berkeley, California was selected given the Bay Area's role as a point of entry from Asia and UC Berkeley's enrollment of the largest number of foreign students on the West Coast. When Harry Edmonds came to Berkeley to establish a site, he chose Piedmont Avenue location in part owing to the concentration of fraternities and sororities which then excluded foreigners and people of color. By proposing this site, Edmonds sought to "strike bigotry and exclusiveness right hard in the nose."

Designed by noted San Francisco Bay Area architect George W. Kelham in a Spanish–Moorish architecture, International House Berkeley officially opened on August 18, 1930. It was the largest student housing complex in the Bay Area and the first coeducational residence west of the Mississippi.

Mission
According to the International House, its mission is to "foster intercultural respect and understanding, lifelong friendships and leadership skills for the promotion of a more tolerant and peaceful world." The House believes it achieves its mission by providing students and scholars from the United States and around the world with an opportunity to live and learn together in a challenging and supportive residential and community-oriented program center.

Notable alumni
The International House, Berkeley was home to six Nobel laureates and one additional member:
 Melvin Calvin (resident: 1937-38) 
 Owen Chamberlain (resident: 1940-41) 
 Andrew Z. Fire (resident: 1977-78)
 Willis Lamb (resident: 1930-38) 
 Julian Schwinger (resident: 1939-40) 
 Glenn Seaborg (non-resident member: 1934-35) 
 Sir Geoffrey Wilkinson (resident: 1946-50)

The International House has also been home to many ambassadors and politicians, including:
 Zulfikar Ali Bhutto (resident: 1940s) 
 W. Michael Blumenthal (resident: 1951)
 Jerry Brown (resident: 1960-61) 
 John Kenneth Galbraith (resident: 1931-32)
 Jan Egeland (resident: 1983)
 Vernon Ehlers (resident: 1956-58) 
 Sadako Ogata (resident: 1956-57)
 Ogbonnaya Onu (resident: 1977-80)
 James Soong (resident)
 Pete Wilson (resident: 1960) 
 Crown Prince Haakon Magnus of Norway (resident: 1996-1997)

Other notable alumni include:
 Eric Schmidt (resident: 1976-80)
 Wendy Schmidt (resident)

Also of note, nearly one thousand alumni of the house have married another resident of the house.

See also

 University of California, Berkeley student housing
 UC Village
 International House of New York
 International Students House, London
 International Student House of Washington, D.C.
Cité internationale universitaire, Paris

References

External links

University and college dormitories in the United States
University of California, Berkeley buildings